Warren Horton Smith (August 5, 1896 – August 30, 1965) was a guard in the National Football League. He played with the Green Bay Packers during the 1921 NFL season. He was born in Paw Paw, Michigan. He played college football at Western Michigan University, lettering in 1920 and 1921. 

He died on a fishing trip in Ontario, Canada in 1965.

References

Green Bay Packers players
American football offensive guards
Western Michigan Broncos football players
1896 births
1965 deaths
Players of American football from Michigan
People from Paw Paw, Michigan